Vera Rico Trilles (born 27 June 2004) is a Spanish footballer who plays as a midfielder for Villarreal.

Club career
Rico started her professional career at Villarreal. She debuted against Córdoba on 22 February 2020 in the 2019–20 Segunda División season.

References

External links
Profile at La Liga

2004 births
Living people
Women's association football midfielders
Spanish women's footballers
People from Plana Alta
Sportspeople from the Province of Castellón
Footballers from the Valencian Community
Villarreal CF (women) players
Primera División (women) players
Segunda Federación (women) players